Robert Kromm (June 8, 1928 – June 9, 2010) was a National Hockey League (NHL) head coach who in 1978 became the first coach of the Detroit Red Wings to win the Jack Adams Award as NHL Coach of the Year.  He led the 1977–78 Red Wings to a 37-point improvement on their 16 win season the year previous, and a second-place finish in the Norris Division.  The Red Wings made the playoffs for the first time in eight years.

Prior to coaching the Wings, Kromm had been a successful coach in the World Hockey Association, where he had guided the high-flying Winnipeg Jets to the 1976 Avco Cup championship.  That fall, he was as an assistant coach for Canada at the inaugural Canada Cup.

In 1961, Kromm took an underdog team from Trail, British Columbia to an Ice Hockey World Championships win over the Russians. The Trail Smoke Eaters represented Canada that year. Kromm coached the Trail Smoke Eaters to the 1962 Allan Cup championship and were chosen to represent Canada at the 1963 Ice Hockey World Championships. When the Western International Hockey League did not operate during the 1962–63 season, the team appealed to the Canadian Amateur Hockey Association (CAHA) for exhibition games in preparation for the World Championships. Canada placed fourth at the 1963 World Championships, its worst result at the time. The CAHA and the Smoke Eaters disagreed on the team's financial statement of the European tour, and Kromm faulted the CAHA for lack of financial assistance and additional players to strengthen the team. CAHA president Art Potter felt that the CAHA had done nothing wrong and accused Kromm of poor judgment in choosing players. The team perceived Potter's statement as censuring the coach and was criticized as "unfair and unsportsmanlike".

Kromm's son, Richard, played ten years in the NHL for the Calgary Flames and New York Islanders.

Born in Calgary, Alberta. Kromm died from complications of colorectal cancer one day after his 82nd birthday in Livonia, Michigan.

NHL/WHA coaching record

References

External links
 

1928 births
2010 deaths
Canada men's national ice hockey team coaches
Deaths from cancer in Michigan
Deaths from colorectal cancer
Detroit Red Wings coaches
Ice hockey people from Calgary
Jack Adams Award winners
Winnipeg Jets (1972–1996) coaches
World Hockey Association coaches